"Forgot About Dre" is a song by American rapper-producer Dr. Dre featuring vocals and sole songwriting from American rapper Eminem, released as second single from the former's album 2001  (1999).

Background

The song is considered a response to diss tracks by Death Row artists on Suge Knight Represents: Chronic 2000, a compilation released by Suge Knight that takes its title from Dre's 1992 album The Chronic. The line "Who you think brought you the oldies, Eazy-E's, Ice Cube's, and DOC's, the Snoop D.O. Double G's, and the group that said 'Motherfuck the police'?" outlines Dre's importance in the rap world, the theme of the song. Dre also mentions how people said he turned to pop music and the criticism that Nas' supergroup The Firm received about The Album, which Dre produced. Eminem's verse features the bizarre violence and aggression typical of his "Slim Shady" alter ego. In an interview, Kendrick Lamar said this and Six-Two's verse from "Xxplosive" tied for the best verses on 2001.

Music video
The video was directed by Philip G. Atwell and was shot between December 24-26, 1999. It was released on January 9, 2000. The video opens at night with Dr. Dre rapping in front of a newsstand in a city. Eminem raps as he walks through a dark city street. A few explicit lines in Eminem's verse are replaced with a skit in which Eminem is answering reporter Jane Yamamoto's questions about a fire he and Dre started. When the video ends, it switches to "Last Dayz" by Hittman. This video won the MTV Video Music Award for Best Rap Video in 2000.

Critical reception
Stephen Thomas Erlewine of AllMusic called "Forgot About Dre" a standout track, praising Eminem's unpredictability. NME wrote that the song "jogs [listeners'] memories" as to Dre's accomplishments" and keeps "his legend simmering." According to Chris Massey of PopMatters, "it's the frantic rap of Eminem that truly stands out, perhaps only because he's the freshest voice on board." Greg Tate of SPIN noted that Dr. Dre uses this song to "make sure all recognize his majesty", with Eminem "standing by him like a cartoon pitbull."

"Forgot About Dre" has been widely regarded as one of Eminem's best songs. Rolling Stone and The Guardian both ranked the song number three on their lists of the greatest Eminem songs.

Awards and nominations

Track listing
UK CD single #1

UK CD single #2

12" vinyl

Charts

Weekly charts

Year-end charts

Certifications

References

External links

1999 songs
2000 singles
Eminem songs
Dr. Dre songs
Horrorcore songs
Gangsta rap songs
Hardcore hip hop songs
Songs written by Eminem
Interscope Records singles
Aftermath Entertainment singles
Song recordings produced by Dr. Dre
Song recordings produced by Mel-Man